The Marion Street Bridge is an automobile bridge located in Salem, Oregon, United States. It spans the Willamette River to connect Salem and West Salem, and acts as a conduit for Oregon Route 22. The bridge carries vehicular traffic one way westbound. Traffic includes two lanes that flow onto the bridge from Marion Street, vehicles turning right from Commercial Street, and traffic from a quarter-loop on-ramp from Front Street that was added in 1981.  Construction began in December 1952 and the bridge opened in 1954, after taking nearly three years to complete. The bridge was built to complement the Center Street Bridge, which switched from two-way traffic to eastbound-only, later expanding to four lanes in 1982. At the time of its opening, the Marion Street Bridge was the longest bridge of its type west of the Mississippi River.

See also 
 List of crossings of the Willamette River

References

External links 

 Historic images of Marion Street Bridge from Salem Public Library

Bridges completed in 1954
Buildings and structures in Salem, Oregon
Bridges over the Willamette River
Transportation buildings and structures in Polk County, Oregon
Transportation in Salem, Oregon
Road bridges in Oregon
1954 establishments in Oregon
Plate girder bridges in the United States